Sylvian Mahuza (born ) is a South African professional rugby union player. He can play as a winger, centre or fullback.

Career

Youth and Varsity Cup rugby

In 2009, he was called up to represent the  Under-16 side at the Grant Khomo Week competition. In 2010 and 2011, he played for their Under-18 side at the Craven Week tournament.

Mahuza made eleven appearances in the  team during the 2012 Under-19 Provincial Championship season, scoring three tries. In 2013, he played four matches in the 2013 Under-21 Provincial Championship, which included a match against  in which he scored two tries.

In the Varsity Cup competition, he played six matches for the  during the 2013 Varsity Cup competition, scoring two tries. He made eight appearances during the 2014 edition of the competition and ran in six tries (making him the second top try scorer in the competition) as the NWU Pukke reached the final.

South Africa Under-20

Mahuza was also included in the South Africa Under-20 side that played against their Argentinean counterparts prior to the 2013 IRB Junior World Championship, but failed to make the final squad for the tournament.

Leopards

Mahuza's first involvement in first team action came during the 2013 Currie Cup First Division season.

Mahuza's next taste of first class action came during the 2014 Currie Cup qualification tournament. He started in five of their matches during the competition.

Eastern Province Kings

An agreement was reached and Mahuza officially joined the Kings on 27 February. He made his debut for the EP Kings by starting their first match of the 2015 Vodacom Cup season, a 19–27 defeat to defending champions . After just one season at the Kings, Mahuza left prior to the 2016 Super Rugby season.

References

South African rugby union players
Living people
1993 births
People from George, South Africa
Rugby union centres
Rugby union wings
Rugby union fullbacks
Leopards (rugby union) players
Eastern Province Elephants players
Lions (United Rugby Championship) players
Golden Lions players
Urayasu D-Rocks players
Rugby union players from the Western Cape